Numappara Dam is an asphalt dam located in Tochigi prefecture in Japan. The dam is used for power production. The catchment area of the dam is  km2. The dam impounds about 18  ha of land when full and can store 4336 thousand cubic meters of water. The construction of the dam was started on 1969 and completed in 1973.

References

Dams in Tochigi Prefecture
1973 establishments in Japan